Robert Szczerbaniuk (born 29 May 1977) is a Polish volleyball player, a member of Poland men's national volleyball team in 1998-2004 and Slovak club VK Prievidza, a participant of the 2004 Olympic Games, six-time Polish Champion (2000, 2001, 2002, 2003, 2005, 2006).

Personal life
He is married to Violetta. They have a son Nataniel and a daughter Nina.

Career
In 2014 he signed a contract with Czech club ČEZ Karlovarsko. After season he moved to Slovak team VK Prievidza.

Sporting achievements

Clubs

CEV Champions League
  2002/2003 - with Mostostal SA Kędzierzyn-Koźle

National championship
 1999/2000  Polish Cup, with Mostostal SA Kędzierzyn-Koźle
 1999/2000  Polish Championship, with Mostostal SA Kędzierzyn-Koźle
 2000/2001  Polish Cup, with Mostostal SA Kędzierzyn-Koźle
 2000/2001  Polish Championship, with Mostostal SA Kędzierzyn-Koźle
 2001/2002  Polish Cup, with Mostostal SA Kędzierzyn-Koźle
 2001/2002  Polish Championship, with Mostostal SA Kędzierzyn-Koźle
 2002/2003  Polish Championship, with Mostostal SA Kędzierzyn-Koźle
 2004/2005  Polish Cup, with KPS Skra Bełchatów
 2004/2005  Polish Championship, with KPS Skra Bełchatów
 2005/2006  Polish Cup, with BOT Skra Bełchatów
 2005/2006  Polish Championship, with BOT Skra Bełchatów
 2007/2008  Polish Cup, with AZS Częstochowa
 2007/2008  Polish Championship, with AZS Częstochowa
 2013/2014  Austrian Championship, with Aon hotVolleys Vienna
 2014/2015  Czech Championship, with ČEZ Karlovarsko

National team
 1996  CEV U21 European Championship
 1997  FIVB U21 World Championship

References

External links
 PlusLiga player profile

1977 births
Living people
Sportspeople from Wrocław
Polish men's volleyball players
Olympic volleyball players of Poland
Volleyball players at the 2004 Summer Olympics
Skra Bełchatów players
Cuprum Lubin players
AZS Częstochowa players
Effector Kielce players
ZAKSA Kędzierzyn-Koźle players
Polish expatriates in Austria
Expatriate volleyball players in Austria
Polish expatriates in the Czech Republic
Expatriate volleyball players in the Czech Republic